The Greeks in Germany comprise German residents or citizens of Greek heritage and Greeks who immigrated to Germany. According to the Federal Statistical Office of Germany, 453,000 people living in Germany in 2019 had full or partial Greek ancestry. 363,650 of these were Greek citizens (including those with dual citizenship).

History

Significant immigration from Greece to Germany started around 1700, when the Ottoman Empire opened its borders.  The first community was found in Leipzig at this time.

The second wave of immigration was when Otto of Wittelbach became King of Greece as Otto of Greece. Many Greeks came as students to Bavaria.

The Greek population of today came mostly after World War II. West Germany needed employees for their expanding industry. In East Germany, Greek communists came as political refugees until 1973.

Many Greek children were involuntarily relocated to the German Democratic Republic by the Communist rebels during the Greek Civil War.

Education
The first Greek schools were created because of the number of Greeks immigrating over to Germany. Since the first Greek school built in 1960 and up until 1990, over 1 million Greeks had immigrated to Germany. About 800,000 of those Greeks had after either a long-term or a short term stay had gone back to Greece. Nowadays, every fifth of an estimated 47,000 students of Greek origin attends one of 35 Greek schools in Germany.

Demographics

The first Greeks came during the time of the Roman Empire to Central Europe. Among the major German cities Offenbach am Main and Stuttgart had the highest share of Greek migrants in 2011 according to German Census data.  Munich was home to the largest Greek community in Germany. According to the same census, there are also large Greek diaspora communities in Nordrhein-Westfalen, especially in Düsseldorf and Bielefeld.

Muslims from Greece 
 
There are some members of the Muslim minority of Greece among the some 350,000 Greeks living in Germany who are from the Muslim minority  Muslim minority of Greece or who espouse a Turcophone identity. The majority of Muslims immigrated from Western Thrace. In the 1960s and 1970s, the Thracian tobacco industry was affected by a severe crisis and many tobacco growers lost their income. This resulted in many Muslims leaving their homes and immigrating to Germany with estimates suggesting that today there are now between 12,000 and 25,000 residing in Germany.

Notable people
Theophano (960-991) - Empress of Holy Roman Empire, Wife of Otto II.
John Argyris (1913-2004) -  was among the creators of the Finite Element Method (FEM)
Daniela Amavia - actress and model
Adam Bousdoukos- from Soul Kitchen
Constantin Carathéodory - mathematician
Miltiades Caridis - conductor
Costa Cordalis - singer/songwriter
Giorgos Donis - footballer
Margaritis Dimitsas  (1830-1903) - geographer
Artemis Gounaki - singer/songwriter
LaFee - singer/songwriter
Georg Anton Jasmatzi (1847-1922) - founder of the Jasmatzi tabac factory (later sold to British American Tobacco)
Aris Kalaizis - painter
Panajotis Kondylis (1943-1998) - philosopher
Jonas Kyratzes - video game designer
Vicky Leandros - singer
Pierre Mavrogordatos (1870-1948) - archaeologist
 Ioannis Masmanidis - footballer
Kostantinos Mitroglou - footballer
Argyris Nastópoulos - singer 
Demis Nikolaidis - footballer 
Antonis Remos - singer  
Susan Sideropoulos- singer and actress 
Despina Vandi - singer  
Anastasia Zampounidis - broadcaster
Linda Zervakis - newscaster (Tagesschau)
Haris & Panos Katsimihas - singers, songwriters, composers
Odisseas Vlachodimos - footballer
Panagiotis Vlachodimos - footballer
Shindy - rapper
Ioannis Panousis - Author, Law Enforcement Specialist
Aziz Retzep German Greek football player

See also
 Germany–Greece relations
 Greek diaspora

References

Your Link to Germany

Bibliography
.
.
.

Further reading
 

Germany
Ethnic groups in Germany
 
Germany–Greece relations